Biwarsar I was the Afrighid ruler of Khwarazm in the third quarter of the 4th century. He was the predecessor of Baghra, and was succeeded by Kawi.

References

Sources
 

4th-century deaths
Year of birth unknown
4th-century Iranian people
Afrighids
Zoroastrian rulers